Serebryakov or Serebriakov is a Russian masculine surname originating from the word serebryak, meaning silversmith; its feminine counterpart is Serebryakova or Serebriakova. Notable persons with the surname include:

Aleksei Serebryakov (disambiguation), multiple persons
Alexander Serebryakov (born 1987), Russian cyclist
Boris Serebryakov (1941–1971), Soviet serial killer
Daria Serebriakova (born 1995), Russian badminton player
Esper Serebryakov (1854–1921), director of the Russian-language newspaper Nakanune
Galina Serebryakova (1905–1980), Polish-Russian writer
I. D. Serebryakov (1917–1998), Russian lexicographer and translator 
Lazar Serebryakov (1795–1862), Russian admiral 
Leonid Serebryakov (1890–1937), Soviet politician
Maria Serebriakova (born 1965), Russian artist
Nikolay Serebryakov (1928–2005), Soviet and Russian director of animated films
Pavel Serebryakov (1909–1977), Russian pianist
Zinaida Serebriakova (1884–1967), Russian and French painter

Fictional characters
Alexander Serebryakov, fictional university professor in Anton Chekhov's play Uncle Vanya 
Viktoriya Ivanovna Serebryakov, fictional first lieutenant in the light novel series The Saga of Tanya the Evil

References

Russian-language surnames